This is a List of Confederate Civil War units from Georgia, many of which were mustered in April 1861.

Infantry

 1st (Regular) Infantry
 1st (Olmstead's/Mercer's) Infantry
 1st (Ramsey's) Infantry
 1st Consolidated Infantry (1st Regular, 47th Infantry and 28th Siege Artillery Btln.)
 2nd Infantry
 3rd Infantry
 4th Infantry
 5th Georgia Volunteer Infantry
 6th Infantry
 7th Infantry
 8th Infantry
 9th Infantry
 10th Infantry
 11th Infantry
 12th Infantry
 13th Infantry
 14th Infantry
 15th Infantry
 16th Infantry
 17th Infantry
 18th Infantry
 19th Infantry
 20th Infantry
 21st Infantry
 22nd Infantry
 23rd Infantry
 24th Infantry
 25th Infantry
 26th Infantry
 27th Infantry 
 28th Infantry
 29th Infantry
 30th Infantry 
 31st Infantry 
 32nd Infantry 
 34th Infantry 
 35th Infantry
 36th Infantry (1st Confederate)
 37th Infantry
 38th Infantry
 39th Infantry
 40th Infantry
 41st Infantry
 42nd Infantry
 43rd Infantry
 44th Infantry
 45th Infantry
 46th Infantry
 47th Infantry
 48th Infantry
 49th Infantry
 50th Infantry
 51st Infantry
 52nd Infantry
 53rd Infantry
 54th Infantry
 55th Infantry
 56th Georgia Volunteer Infantry
 57th Infantry
 59th Infantry
 60th Infantry
 61st Georgia Volunteer Infantry
 63d Infantry
 64th Infantry
 65th Infantry
 66th Infantry
 2nd Georgia Infantry Battalion
 7th Georgia Infantry Battalion
 8th Georgia Infantry Battalion
 9th Battalion, Infantry
 10th Georgia Infantry Battalion
 18th Georgia Infantry Battalion
 26th Georgia Infantry Battalion
 27th Georgia Infantry Battalion
 40th Georgia Infantry Battalion
 1st Georgia Sharpshooter Battalion
 2nd Georgia Sharpshooter Battalion
 3rd Georgia Sharpshooter Battalion
 4th Georgia Sharpshooter Battalion

Cavalry

 1st Cavalry
 2nd Cavalry
 3rd Cavalry
 4th Cavalry (Clinch's)
 5th Cavalry
 Georgia Hussars (Company A)
 7th Cavalry
 8th Cavalry
 10th Cavalry
 11th Cavalry
 12th Cavalry
 13th Cavalry
 29th Cavalry
 62nd Cavalry
 1st Battalion, Georgia Cavalry
 2nd Cavalry Battalion
 19th Cavalry Battalion
 20th Cavalry Battalion
 21st Cavalry Battalion
 24th Cavalry Battalion
 29th Cavalry Battalion

Artillery
 1st Artillery
 9th Artillery Battalion
 11th Artillery Battalion (Sumter Artillery)
 12th Light Artillery Battalion
 14th (Montgomery's) Battalion, Light Artillery 
 22nd Battalion, Heavy Artillery
 28th Battalion, Siege Artillery
 Anderson's (Captain) Battalion, Light Artillery 
 Maxwell's (Captain) Battalion, Regular Light Artillery
 Baker's (Captain) Company, Artillery 
 Barnwell's (Captain) Battery, Light Artillery 
 Bartow Artillery 
 Blodgett's Flying Artillery 
 Brooks' (Captain) Company (Terrell Light Artillery) 
 Campbell's (Captain) Independent Company, Siege Artillery 
 Chatham Artillery (Wheaton's Artillery) 
 Chatham Siege Artillery 
 Cherokee Artillery (Van Den Corput's Company)
 Chestatee Artillery 
 Clinch's (Captain) Battery, Light Artillery 
 Columbus Artillery 
 Cooper's Artillery Company 
 Croft's (Captain) Battery, Light Artillery (Columbus Artillery) 
 Daniell's Battery, Light Artillery 
 Dunn's (Captain) Company, Artillery (Bartow Artillery) 
 Ferrell's (Captain) Battery, Light Artillery 
 Forrest Artillery 
 Fraser's (Captain) Battery, Light Artillery (Pulaski Artillery)
 Guerard's (Captain) Battery, Light Artillery 
 Hamilton's (Captain) Company, Light Artillery (Company A, 1st Regular Infantry)
 Hanleiter's (Captain) Company, Light Artillery (Jo Thompson Artillery) 
 Havis' (Captain) Battery, Light Artillery 
 Howell's (Captain) Company, Light Artillery 
 Hudson's (Captain) Company, Light Artillery (Arsenal Battery) 
 King's (Captain) Battery, Light Artillery 
 Lumpkin's (Captain) Company, Artillery 
 Massenburg's (Captain) Battery, Light Artillery (Jackson Artillery) 
 Maxwell's (Captain) Regular Light Battery, Artillery (Company D, 1st Regular Infantry)
 Milledge's (Captain) Company, Light Artillery 
 Moore's (Captain) Battery, Artillery 
 Pritchard's (Captain) Company, Light Artillery (Washington Artillery) 
 Ritter's (Captain) Company, Light Artillery 
 Scogin's (Captain) Battery, Light Artillery (Griffin Light Artillery) 
 Siege Train (Major Buist) Artillery 
 Slaten's (Captain) Company, Artillery (Macon Light Artillery) 
 Tiller's (Captain) Company (Echols Light Artillery) 
 Wheaton's (Captain) Company, Artillery (Chatham Artillery)

State Guards
 1st Infantry (State Guards) 
 5th Infantry (State Guards)
 6th Infantry (State Guards)
 7th Infantry (State Guards)
 8th Infantry (State Guards) 
 9th Infantry (State Guards) 
 1st Battalion, Infantry (State Guards) 
 2nd Battalion, Infantry (Atlanta Arsenal Battalion, State Guards) 
 3rd Battalion (Atlanta Fire Battalion, State Guards) 
 4th Battalion, Infantry (State Guards) 
 5th Battalion, Infantry (State Guards) 
 11th Battalion, Infantry (State Guards) 
 13th Battalion, Infantry (State Guards) 
 14th Battalion, Infantry (State Guards) 
 17th Battalion, Infantry (State Guards) 
 18th Battalion, Infantry (State Guards) 
 19th Battalion, Infantry (State Guards)
 Hansell's (Captain) Company, Infantry (State Guards)
 2nd Cavalry (State Guards) 
 3rd Cavalry (State Guards)
 4th Cavalry (State Guards)
 10th Cavalry (State Guards) 
 11th Cavalry (State Guards) 
 12th (Robinson's) Cavalry (State Guards) 
 12th (Wright's) Cavalry (State Guards) 
 6th Battalion, Cavalry (State Guards) 
 7th Battalion, Cavalry (State Guards) 
 8th Battalion, Cavalry (State Guards) 
 9th Battalion, Cavalry (State Guards) 
 10th Battalion, Cavalry (State Guards) 
 12th Battalion, Cavalry (State Guards) 
 15th Battalion, Cavalry (State Guards) 
 16th Battalion, Cavalry (State Guards)  
 22d Battalion, Cavalry (State Guards) 
 1st Gordon Squadron, Cavalry (State Guards) 
 Bond's (Captain) Company, Cavalry (State Guards)

State Troops
 1st Regiment (State Troops) 
 2nd Regiment, Infantry, State Troops 
 2nd Battalion, State Troops 
 11th (State Troops)
 Etowah Iron Works Artillery (State Troops) 
 Fay's Battery (Etowah Iron Works Artillery) (State Troops) 
 Pruden's Battery, Artillery (State Troops)

Legions
 1st Georgia Legion 
 Infantry Battalion
 Cavalry Regiment (6th Cavalry)
 Cobb's Legion
 Infantry Battalion
 Cavalry Regiment (9th Cavalry)
 Carlton's Battery (Troup Artillery)
 Cherokee Legion (State Guards) 
 Floyd Legion
 Infantry (State Guards) 
 Cavalry (State Guards) 
 Phillips' Legion 
 Infantry Battalion
 Blue Ridge Rifles (Company E)
 Cavalry Battalion
 Smith's Legion
 Wright's Legion

Other units
 1st (Fannin's) Reserves 
 1st (Symons') Reserves
 1st Battalion, Reserves, Artillery 
 1st Battalion, Reserves, Cavalry 
 1st Battalion, Reserves, Infantry 
 1st City Battalion, Infantry (Columbus) 
 1st Confederate Battalion, Infantry 
 1st Local Troops, Infantry 
 1st Militia 
 1st Ordnance Battalion 
 1st Regiment (Army of Georgia)
 1st Regiment (Reserves) 
 1st Regiment, Engineer Troops 
 1st Regiment, Infantry (Local Troops) (Augusta) 
 1st Regiment, Light Duty Men 
 1st Regiment, Troops and Defenses (Macon) 
 1st State Line 
 2nd Battalion Troops and Defences (Macon) 
 2nd Militia 
 2nd Regiment, Militia 
 2nd Reserves 
 2nd State Line, Including Stapleton's and Storey's 3d Infantry 
 2nd Division, Militia  
 3rd Reserves 
 4th (Avery's) Cavalry
 4th (Clinch's) Cavalry 
 4th Infantry (State Guard) 
 4th Reserves 
 5th Militia 
 5th Reserves 
 6th Militia 
 6th Reserves 
 6th State Line 
 10th Militia 
 12th Militia 
 23rd Battalion, Militia (Cook's Reserve Battalion) 
 23rd Battalion, Infantry, Local Defense (Athens Battalion, Enfield Rifle Battalion) 
 25th Battalion, Infantry (Provost Guard) 
 27th Battalion, Infantry (Non-Conscripts) 
 Alexander's (Captain) Company, Cavalry 
 Alexander's (Captain) Company, Infantry 
 Allen's (Captain) Company, Cavalry 
 Anderson's (Captain) Company, Infantry (Anderson Guards) 
 Arnold's (Captain) Company, Cavalry 
 Arsenal Battalion, Infantry (Columbus) 
 Asher's (Captain) Company (Murray Cavalry) 
 Athens Reserve Corps, Infantry 
 Atlanta Arsenal Battery, Light Artillery (Local Troops) 
 Atwater's (Captain) Company, Infantry 
 Augusta Battalion, Infantry 
 Baird's (Captain) Company, Infantry 
 Baldwin Ordnance Battalion (Local Defense) 
 Bard's Company, Infantry 
 Barney's (Captain) Company, Infantry (Richmond Factory Guards) 
 Blue Ridge Tiger Regiment (State Guard) 
 Boddie's (Captain) Company (Troup [County] Independent Cavalry) 
 Bradshaw's Cavalry Battalion 
 Brook's (Captain) Company, Infantry (Mitchell Home Guards) 
 Camden County Militia (Mounted) 
 Caraker's (Captain) Company, Infantry (Milledgeville Guards) 
 Chapman's (Captain) Company, Infantry (Defenders) 
 Chatham Light Horse 
 City Battalion, Infantry (Columbus) 
 City Light Guards (Columbus) 
 Clemons' (Captain) Company, Infantry 
 Coast Guard Battalion, Militia 
 Cobb's Guards, Infantry 
 Coffee Revengers 
 Collier's (Captain) Company, Infantry 
 Collier's (Captain) Company, Infantry (Collier Guards) 
 Conscripts, Georgia 
 Corbin's (Captain) Company, Cavalry 
 Dorough's Battalion, Cavalry 
 Dozier's (Captain) Company, Infantry 
 Ezzard's (Captain) Company, Infantry 
 First Battalion, Reserve Cavalry 
 Floyd's (Captain) Company, Cavalry 
 Fuller's (Captain) Company, Infantry 
 Garrison's (Captain) Company, Infantry (Ogeechee Minute Men) 
 Gartrell's (Captain) Company, Cavalry 
 Green's (Captain) Company, Infantry (State Armory Guards) 
 Grubb's (Captain) Company, Infantry 
 Hall's (Captain) Company, Cavalry 
 Hamlet's (Captain) Company, Infantry 
 Hardwick Mounted Rifles 
 Harris' (Captain) Independent Company, Infantry (Brunswick Rifles) 
 Heard County Rangers, Infantry (part of the 41st Infantry)
 Hendry's (Captain) Company, Cavalry (Atlantic and Gulf Guards) 
 Hendry's (Captain) Company, Mounted Infantry (Pierce Mounted Volunteers) 
 Holmes' (Captain) Company, Infantry (Wright Local Guards) 
 Howard's (Captain) Company, Infantry (Non-Conscripts) 
 Hull's (Captain) Company, Infantry 
 Humphrey's (Captain) Company, Independent Cavalry (Reserves) 
 Jackson's (Captain) Company, Infantry 
 Jones' (Captain) Company, Infantry (Jones Hussars) 
 Kay's (Captain) Company, Infantry (Franklin County Guards) 
 Lane's (Captain) Company, Infantry (Jasper and Butts County Guards) 
 Logan's (Captain) Company, Cavalry (White County Old Men's Home Guards) 
 Matthews' (Captain) Company, Infantry (East to West Point Guards) 
 Mayer's (Captain) Company (Appling Cavalry) 
 Medlin's (Captain) Independent Company, Infantry (High Shoals Defenders) 
 Milner's (Captain) Company, Infantry (Madison County Home Guard) 
 Miscellaneous, Georgia 
 Moore's (Captain) Company, Infantry (Baldwin Infantry) 
 Moring's (Captain) Company, Infantry (Emanuel Troops) 
 Nancy Harts (Nancy Hart Rifles)
 Nelson's (Captain) Independent Company, Cavalry 
 Newbern's (Captain) Company, Cavalry (Coffee Revengers) 
 Pemberton's (Captain) Company, Cavalry 
 Pool's (Captain) Company, Infantry 
 Porter's (Captain) Company (Georgia Railroad Guards) 
 Preston's (Captain) Company (Railroad Guards) 
 Ragland's Company, Cavalry 
 Rigdon Guards 
 Roberts' (Captain) Company, Exempts 
 Roswell Battalion, Cavalry 
 Rowland's Battalion, Conscripts 
 Rumph's (Captain) Company (Wayne Cavalry Guards) 
 Russell's (Captain) Company (Newton Factory Employees) 
 Russell's (Captain) Company, Cavalry 
 Taylor's (Captain) Company 
 Thornton's (Captain) Company (Muscogee Guards) 
 Waring's (Lieutenant) Company, Cavalry 
 Weem's (Lieutenant) Detachment, Camp Guard (Augusta) 
 White's (Captain) Company 
 Whiteside's Naval Battalion, Infantry (Local Defense) 
 Witt's (Captain) Company (Express Infantry) 
 Wyly's (Captain) Company (Mell Scouts) 
 Young's (Captain) Company, Cavalry (Alleghany Troopers)
 Youngblood's Battalion, Infantry
 Zollicoffer Guards, Infantry

Artillery

Cavalry

Infantry

See also
List of American Civil War units by state
List of Georgia Union Civil War units

References

External links
http://www.civilwarhome.com/chancellorsvilleanv.htm
http://www.civilwarhome.com/anvfredericksburg.htm
4th Georgia Cavalry at the Battle of Olustee, Florida
Chatham Artillery (Captain John F. Wheaton commanding) at the Battle of Olustee, Florida
Guerard's Artillery at the Battle of Olustee, Florida
28th Georgia Artillery Battalion at the Battle of Olustee, Florida
1st Georgia Regulars at the Battle of Olustee, Florida
6th Georgia Volunteer Infantry at the Battle of Olustee, Florida
19th Georgia Volunteer Infantry at the Battle of Olustee, Florida
23rd Georgia Volunteer Infantry at the Battle of Olustee, Florida
28th Georgia Volunteer Infantry at the Battle of Olustee, Florida
32nd Georgia Volunteer Infantry at the Battle of Olustee, Florida
64th Georgia Volunteer Infantry at the Battle of Olustee, Florida

 
Georgia
Civil War